North Fork Dam may refer to:

 North Fork Dam (Clackamas County, Oregon), which impounds the Clackamas River
 North Fork Dam (Placer County, California), which impounds the North Fork American River
 North Fork Dam (Santa Clara County, California), which impounds the North Fork Pacheco Creek

See also
 North Fork (disambiguation)